"Under Your Thumb" is a song written and recorded by English duo Godley & Creme, released as the lead single from their fourth studio album, Ismism (1981). The single peaked at No. 3 on the UK Singles Chart in October 1981. The single features the non-album track, "Power Behind the Throne", as its B-side.

Charts

References

External links
 

1981 songs
1981 singles
Songs written by Kevin Godley
Songs written by Lol Creme
Godley & Creme songs
Polydor Records singles